Words of Love is a solo album by pianist Tete Montoliu recorded in 1976 and released on the Danish label, SteepleChase in 1978 and as a CD with additional tracks in 1994.

Track listing
All compositions by Tete Montoliu except where noted
 "Complication" – 3:43
 "Words of Love" (Joan Manuel Serrat) – 5:44  
 "Iru Damachu" – 4:55
 "Pietsie" – 3:24
 "You Know" – 6:07
 "I Didn't Know That" – 3:36
 "Ballad for Carmen" – 2:23
 "Point and Counterpoint" – 4:45
 "Afscheid" (Robert Long) – 2:07 Additional track on CD release
 "Willow Weep for Me" (Ann Ronell) – 4:43 Additional track on CD release  
 "You Don't Know What Love Is" (Gene de Paul, Don Raye) – 3:49 Additional track on CD release  
 "Airegin" (Sonny Rollins) – 2:23 Additional track on CD release

Personnel
Tete Montoliu – piano

References

Tete Montoliu albums
1978 albums
SteepleChase Records albums
Solo piano jazz albums